Jukka is a common Finnish given name for males.

History 

Jukka is an old variant of the name Johannes, a biblical name spread over to Finland through Sweden with the introduction of Christianity. Jukka remained a nickname for people registered by authorities as Johan, Johannes, Juho etc., and did not appear in official records until the late 19th century. The name was added to the official list of first names in the Finnish almanac managed by the Almanac Office at the University of Helsinki in 1950, and its name day is June 24, also the name day of Johannes and other variants, and the traditional midsummer day, or Juhannus.

Popularity 
The name Jukka enjoyed the highest popularity in the years 1960–1979, though it was much used during the previous two decades as well. The 1980s and 1990s saw a marked decline in the name's popularity, and in recent years not many children have been named Jukka.

As surname 

Jukka is also a Finnish surname of Karelian origin, derived from the forename, and as of 5 February 2007 it is held by 201 Finnish citizens.

Notable Jukkas 
A list of notable holders of the name Jukka:

 (born 1951), organist in the progressive rock band Wigwam
Jukka Hentunen (born 1974), ice hockey player
Jukka Hilden (born 1980), one of The Dudesons
Jukka Jalonen (born 1962), ice hockey coach
Jukka Jokikokko (born 1970), bassist in Burning Point and studio engineer
Jukka Kajava (1942–2005), journalist and critic
Jukka "J." Karjalainen (born 1957), musician
Jukka Keskisalo (born 1981), steeplechaser
 (born 1952), non-fiction author
Jukka Korpela (born 1957), professor, historian
Jukka Koskinen (born 1981), bassist of Wintersun
Jukka Kuoppamäki (born 1942), musician
Jukka Laaksonen (born 1958), impressionist
Jukka Lehtovaara (born 1988), football goalkeeper
Jukka Lewis (born 1963), bassist in Yö
Jukka Mikkola (born 1943), politician
Jukka "Sir Christus" Mikkonen (born 1979), guitarist in Negative
Jukka Nevalainen (born 1978), former drummer of the symphonic metal band Nightwish
Jukka Orma (born 1956), guitarist in Sielun Veljet
Jukka Paarma (born 1942), archbishop emeritus of the Evangelical Lutheran Church of Finland
Jukka Parkkinen (born 1948), author
Jukka Perko (born 1968), jazz saxophonist
Jukka Puotila (born 1955), actor, comedian, and impressionist
Jukka Raitala (born 1988), football player
Jukka Rasila (born 1969), actor
Jukka Rauhala (born 1959), freestyle wrestling Olympic medalist
Jukka Reverberi (born 1979), Italian singer of the group Giardini di Mirò
Jukka "Jukka Poika" Rousu (born 1981), reggae musician
Jukka Rintala (born 1952), fashion designer
Jukka Rislakki (born 1945), journalist and author
Jukka-Pekka Saraste (born 1956), conductor and violinist
Jukka Sipilä (1936–2004), actor
Jukka Takalo, musician
Jukka Tilsa (born 1961), cartoonist
Jukka Toijala (born 1972), basketball coach and former player
Jukka Toivola (born 1949), long-distance runner
Jukka Tolonen (born 1952), guitar virtuoso
Jukka Virtanen (born 1933), author, actor, director, journalist, media person
Jukka Virtanen (born 1959), ice hockey player

Fictional Jukkas 

Jörö-Jukka, Finnish name of the German Struwwelpeter character
Unijukka, a Finnish name of the Sandman
Jukka Sarasti, a vampire in the novel Blindsight

Other uses 

jukkapalmu, Finnish name of the common houseplant Yucca elephantipes
tiskijukka, Finnish word for disc jockey with a nonsensical literal meaning, much less frequently used than DJ or deejii, or deejay by the English pronunciation

Notes

Finnish masculine given names
Masculine given names